The Deusmauer Moor is a nature reserve near Deusmauer, in the municipality of Velburg in the Upper Palatine county of Neumarkt in der Oberpfalz in the German state of Bavaria.

The reserve is located 5.8 kilometres northwest of Velburg. It is part of the Special Area of Conservation called Talmoore an der Schwarzen Laaber.

The reserve covers an area of 73 hectares and is an extensive fen complex on the Schwarze Laber river. It is notable due to the presence of rare plants that are ice age relics. To preserve its characteristic wetland flora, conservation has been carried out for years. The reserve was designated in 1952 and placed under further protection by a new regulation on 28 June 1980.

References

External links 

 www.regierung.oberpfalz.bayern.de, Kurzinfo
 Lage und Ausdehnung des Naturschutzgebietes in OpenStreetMap

Bogs of Bavaria
Nature reserves in Bavaria
Neumarkt (district)